Chupan Boneh-ye Ajand (also Romanized as Chūpān Boneh-ye Ājand; also known as Chūpān Boneh and Chūpān Boneh Zenīvand) is a village in Mehravan Rural District, in the Central District of Neka County, Mazandaran Province, Iran. At the 2006 census, its population was 44, in 11 families.

References 

Populated places in Neka County